Roger Laurent (21 February 1913 – 6 February 1997) was a racing driver and motorcycle racer from Belgium. He was born in Liège and died in Uccle. Laurent competed aboard a Moto Guzzi in the 1949 Grand Prix motorcycle racing season, entering the Belgian Grand Prix. He also participated in two World Championship Formula One Grands Prix, debuting on 22 June 1952. He scored no championship points.

Complete Formula One World Championship results
(key)

References

1913 births
1997 deaths
Belgian racing drivers
Belgian Formula One drivers
Hersham and Walton Motors Formula One drivers
Ecurie Francorchamps Formula One drivers
24 Hours of Le Mans drivers
500cc World Championship riders
Belgian motorcycle racers
Sportspeople from Liège
World Sportscar Championship drivers
24 Hours of Spa drivers